Aboubacar M'Baye Camara (born 27 December 1985) is a Guinean footballer who plays as a midfielder for Andenne.

Career
He joined in summer 2004 to Belgian side K.S.C. Lokeren Oost-Vlaanderen from his native Guinean club Satellite FC.

In 2017, Camara signed with Meux. He joined Belgian Division 3 club Spy the following season.

References 

1985 births
Living people
Guinean footballers
Guinea international footballers
Guinean expatriate footballers
K.S.C. Lokeren Oost-Vlaanderen players
Satellite FC players
Khor Fakkan Sports Club players
Dubai CSC players
Al-Ittihad Kalba SC players
Belgian Pro League players
Expatriate footballers in Belgium
Expatriate footballers in the United Arab Emirates
Association football midfielders
UAE First Division League players
UAE Pro League players
R.F.C. Meux players